Penumbra is an episodic survival horror video game series developed by Frictional Games and published by Paradox Interactive and Lexicon Entertainment. The games use the HPL Engine 1, initially developed as a tech demo. Penumbra is notable for its horror styling and for allowing advanced physical interaction with the game environment.

Main series

Penumbra: Overture (2007)

Set in the year 2001, Penumbra: Overture follows the story of Philip, a thirty-year-old physicist whose mother recently died. After receiving a mysterious letter from his supposedly dead father, Philip follows a series of clues that lead him to a mysterious location in uninhabited northern Greenland.

Penumbra: Black Plague (2008)

The story of Black Plague begins as an email sent by Philip to a friend, explaining what has happened to him and begging him to finish the work he could not. The rest of the game then proceeds as a flashback narrated by Philip to his friend in the email, beginning from where the previous game left off.

Penumbra: Requiem (2008)

A puzzle expansion with nine levels for the Black Plague Gold Edition. The game starts as the last one ends, with Phillip sending the 'kill them all' message. As soon as he finishes, one of the Infected barges in and hits Phillip on the head with something unseen.

Penumbra (Tech Demo)
The Penumbra series is based on Frictional Games' earlier game "Penumbra Tech Demo", a short tech demo meant to demonstrate the capabilities of the company's HPL Engine 1. The developers admitted that they edited the original engine which was 2D to support 3D environments.

References

External links

 Frictional Games on Steam

Penumbraseries at ModDB

Video game franchises
Video game franchises introduced in 2007